Ho Liang Shung (1879-1952) was a Chinese engineer and spy. 

Ho was born April 15, 1879.

In January 1904, Ho and Sidney Reilly stole the Port Arthur harbor defense plans for the Japanese navy, enabling it to navigate through the Russian minefield protecting the harbor, in the Battle of Port Arthur. The surprise attack was allegedly made possible by the intelligence gathering of Sidney Reilly and Ho Liang Shung  in June. 

Ho was a Chinese engineer working for the head marine architect Svirski. Ho Liang Shung had a detailed knowledge of the harbor defense plans.

Ho died May 14, 1952.

References

Chinese engineers
Chinese spies
People of the Russo-Japanese War
1879 births
1952 deaths